Cobb's Engine House (properly known as Windmill End Pumping Station) in Rowley Regis, West Midlands, England, is a scheduled ancient monument and a Grade II listed building built around 1831.

It housed a stationary steam pump used to pump water firstly from Windmill End Colliery and later other mines in the area. Utilizing a shaft 525 feet deep, 1,600,000 litres of water were pumped from the mines into the canal daily. It ceased work in 1928 and the Newcomen type engine was moved to the Henry Ford Museum in Dearborn, Michigan in 1930. The engine house originally had a cylinder floor at ground level and two floors above but they and the roof have gone, leaving the building as a shell.

It stands near Windmill End Junction in the Warren's Hall local nature reserve, where the Dudley No. 2 Canal and the Boshboil Arm meets the southern end of the Netherton Tunnel Branch Canal. The area came into the possession of Sir Horace St.Paul from his father-in-law, John Ward, 2nd Viscount Dudley and Ward, on his marriage to John's daughter Anna Maria Ward. It was Horace who instigated the construction of the engine house.

References

External links

Engine houses
Buildings and structures in Sandwell
Preserved beam engines
Rowley Regis